Nocardioides daeguensis is a gram-positive, rod-shaped, nitrate-reducing and non-spore-forming bacterium from the genus Nocardioides that has been isolated from sludge from an industrial wastewater treatment plant in Daegu, South Korea.

References

External links
Type strain of Nocardioides daeguensis at BacDive -  the Bacterial Diversity Metadatabase

daeguensis
Bacteria described in 2013